Tajabad (also Romanized as Tājābād; also known as Tājābād-e Pā’īn, Tājābād-e Soflá, and Taj Abad Sofla) is a village in Khosuyeh Rural District, in the Central District of Zarrin Dasht County, Fars Province, Iran. At the 2006 census, its population was 738, in 139 families.

References 

Populated places in Zarrin Dasht County